Ceramidia phemonoides is a moth of the subfamily Arctiinae. It was described by Heinrich Benno Möschler in 1854. It is found in Ecuador and the Amazon region.

References

Euchromiina
Moths described in 1854